Christian Møller (22 December 1904 in Hundslev, Als14 January 1980 in Ordrup) was a Danish chemist and physicist who made fundamental contributions to the theory of relativity, theory of gravitation and quantum chemistry. He is known for Møller–Plesset perturbation theory and Møller scattering.

His suggestion in 1938 to Otto Frisch that the newly discovered process of nuclear fission might create surplus energy, led Frisch to conceive of the concept of the nuclear chain reaction, leading to the Frisch–Peierls memorandum, which kick-started the development of nuclear energy through the MAUD Committee and the Manhattan Project.

Møller was the director of the European Organization for Nuclear Research (CERN)'s Theoretical Study Group between 1954 and 1957 and later a member of the same organization's Scientific Policy Committee (1959-1972).

Møller tetrad theory of gravitation 
In 1961, Møller showed that a tetrad description of gravitational fields allows a more rational treatment of the energy–momentum complex than in a theory based on the metric tensor alone. The advantage of using tetrads as gravitational variables was connected with the fact that this allowed to construct expressions for the energy-momentum complex which had more satisfactory transformation properties than in a purely metric formulation.

Books
The world and the atom, London, 1940.
The theory of relativity, Clarendon Press, Oxford, 1972.
A study in gravitational collapse, Kobenhavn : Munksgaard, 1975.
On the crisis in the theory of gravitation and a possible solution,  Kobenhavn : Munksgaard, 1978.
Evidence for gravitational theories (ed.), Academic Press, 1963.
Interview with Dr. Christian Moller by Thomas S. Kuhn at Copenhagen July 29, 1963  Oral History Transcript — Dr. Christian Moller

See also
Born rigidity
Proper reference frame (flat spacetime)

References

20th-century Danish physicists
Danish chemists
Quantum physicists
1904 births
1980 deaths
Relativity theorists
People associated with CERN
People from Gentofte Municipality
Members of the Royal Swedish Academy of Sciences